The Two Medicine River is a tributary of the Marias River, approximately   60 mi (97 km) long, in northwestern Montana in the United States.

It rises in the Rocky Mountain Front in Glacier National Park at the continental divide and flows east, down from the mountains and across the Blackfeet Indian Reservation. It receives Birch Creek in southeastern Glacier County and joins Cut Bank Creek to form the Marias, approximately 12 mi (19 km) southeast of Cut Bank.

See also

List of rivers of Montana
Montana Stream Access Law

Notes

Landforms of Glacier National Park (U.S.)
Rivers of Montana
Rivers of Glacier County, Montana
Bodies of water of Pondera County, Montana